Maria Kun  (born 17 April 1973) is a Swedish former football forward who played for the Sweden women's national football team. She competed at the 1996 Summer Olympics, playing three matches. At the club level, she played for Gideonsberg IF.

See also
 Sweden at the 1996 Summer Olympics

References

External links
 
 

1973 births
Living people
Swedish women's footballers
Place of birth missing (living people)
Footballers at the 1996 Summer Olympics
Olympic footballers of Sweden
Women's association football forwards
Sweden women's international footballers
Gideonsbergs IF players